Pore may refer to:

Biology

Animal biology and microbiology 
 Sweat pore, an anatomical structure of the skin of humans (and other mammals) used for secretion of sweat
 Hair follicle, an anatomical structure of the skin of humans (and other mammals) used for secretion of sebum
 Canal pore, an anatomical structure that is part of the lateral line sense system of some aquatic organisms
 Gonopore, a genital pore present in some invertebrates, particularly insects
 Ozopore, the external discharge site of defensive glands in millipedes and some arachnids
 An opening across both inner and outer bacterial membranes, a part of many Gram-negative bacterial secretion systems
 One of the openings communicating with the skin surface at the terminus of lactiferous ducts in milk-producing mammals

Plant and fungal biology 
 Germ pore, a small pore in the outer wall of a fungal spore through which the germ tube exits upon germination
 Stoma, a small opening on a plant leaf used for gas exchange
 An anatomical feature of the anther in some plant species, the opening through which pollen is released
 A characteristic surface feature of porate pollen
 An opening in a poricidal fruit capsule

Cell and molecular biology 
 Nuclear pore, a large protein complex that penetrates the nuclear envelope in eukaryotic cells
 Ion channel pore, the ion-selective opening in the membrane of a eukaryotic cell formed by members of the ion channel family of proteins
 A water-selective opening (water channel) in the membrane of a eukaryotic cell formed by assemblies of the protein aquaporin

People

Given name
 Pore Mosulishvili (1918–1944), decorated Soviet soldier during World War II

Family name
 Ryan Pore (born 1983), American soccer player
 Daniel Alolga Akata Pore, Ghanaian politician

Physical sciences 
Pore (material), one of many small openings in a solid substance of any kind that contribute to the substance's porosity (typical usage in earth sciences, materials science and construction)
 A small defect in the crystal structure that may arise during sintering to form solids from powders, including ceramics
 Pore (bread), an air pocket in bread
 Pore space in soil, the liquid and gas phases of soil
 Void (composites), a pore that remains unoccupied in a composite material
 Solar pore, a newly forming sunspot without a penumbra

Places
 Partap Pore, a village in the Leh district of Ladakh, India
 Pig-poré, a village in Burkina Faso
 Pore, Casanare, a town and municipality in the Department of Casanare, Colombia

Other uses 
 P.O.R.E. (Partido Obrero Revolucionario de España), the Revolutionary Workers' Party of Spain

See also 
 
 
 Poor (disambiguation)
 Poore
 Por (disambiguation)
 Pour (disambiguation)

io:Poro